Daily Observer may refer to:
 The Daily Observer (Antigua), the only daily newspaper of Antigua and Barbuda, est. 1993
Northern Daily Leader, published in Tamworth, New South Wales, Australia, and formerly known as The Daily Observer
 The Daily Observer (Bangladesh), est. 2011
The Daily Observer, published in The Gambia
Liberian Observer, which has also used the name Daily Observer
Chicago Daily Observer, a conservative Internet publication founded by Tom Roeser

See also 
 Observer (disambiguation)
 The Observer (disambiguation)
 National Observer (disambiguation)